Ulva prolifera is a species of seaweed in the family Ulvaceae that can be found worldwide.

Distribution
In Europe, it can be found in such countries as Bulgaria, France, Great Britain, Greece, Ireland, Portugal, Romania, Slovenia, Spain and on Lolland island of Denmark. It is also common on African islands such as Canary and Madeira islands, and in the US states such as Alaska, California, Florida, Texas and Washington. Besides the states, Africa and Europe, it is common in Central American countries such as Costa Rica, El Salvador, Panama, and Cuba, with Mexico occasionally getting them on the Pacific side.

China had its largest recorded bloom of the algae in 2013, in the Yellow Sea off the coast of Qingdao.

In other languages
The species have common names in other countries of the world:

Gallery

References

Further reading

Ulvaceae
Plants described in 2007